Magnetic Island (Wulguru: Yunbenun) is an island  offshore from the city of Townsville, Queensland, Australia. This  mountainous island in Cleveland Bay has effectively become a suburb of Townsville, with 2,335 permanent residents. The island is accessible from Townsville Breakwater to Nelly Bay Harbour by ferry. There is a large  National Park and bird sanctuary and walking tracks can be taken between the populated bays and to a number of tourist destinations such as the World War II forts.

The island is a holiday destination with many hotels and several resorts in operation to cater for all levels of service. The public facilities and infrastructure on the island are managed by the Townsville City Council. The island is part of the electoral district of Townsville in the Legislative Assembly of Queensland, and part of the Federal seat of Herbert, which is represented by Phillip Thompson.

There are five settlements, namely Arcadia, Horseshoe Bay, Nelly Bay, Picnic Bay, and West Point.  Geographic features include Rocky Bay, Picnic Bay and Hawkings Point, around its southern extremity, a bay, Nelly Bay to the east-north-east of Rocky Bay, followed by Geoffrey Bay, with Bremner Point as its northern arm. Horseshoe Bay is on the northern coast, and Cockle Bay Reef off the western coast.

Naming
The Wulguru name for the island is Yunbenun. The first European accounts of the island come from Captain James Cook who, in 1770, while navigating the Australian coast, called the island Magnetical Island, as a magnetic pull interfering with his vessel's compass appeared to emanate from the island. People have since explored the general area of Magnetic Island with various instruments to discover what might have caused the effect that Cook reported, but nothing has been discovered. Local names for the island are "Maggie Isle", "Maggie Island", or "The Island".

History

Pre-European settlement

Yunbenun is the traditional land of the Wulgurukaba people. It had a transient population of Aboriginal people well before European exploration of the area. They had seasonal camps at a number of bays, and travelled between the island and mainland using canoes. A number of Aboriginal burial sites are said to exist on the island, but have so far not been identified. Aboriginal middens and cave drawings can still be found in a number of bays around Yunbenun. Folklore of the local Wulguru tribe recounts a long association with the island and annual migrations to the mainland to avoid expeditions of head-hunters from Papua New Guinea and the Torres Strait, which used the northern trade winds to travel south along the Queensland coast. This head-hunting nearly ceased following the arrival of missionaries, led by Samuel MacFarlane to the Torres Straits in 1871.

European settlement and development

J.M. Black, funded by Robert Towns, founded the township of Townsville on the mainland nearby. As Townsville developed through the mid-19th century, Magnetic Island became a valuable location for the gathering of hoop pine and granite, the latter of which was used in the reclamation of land for the Port of Townsville, and for construction of Townsville's Customs House.

Picnic Bay was named after its popularity as a picnic spot for European tourists from the mainland during the 19th century, before Magnetic Island was first inhabited by Europeans. In the mid-19th century the island became a popular location for the collection of stone and coral needed for development on the mainland. Even substantial quantities of gold were mined in 1886.

In 1875, the island was set aside as a quarantine station although it took another ten years for the proper facilities to be set up at West Point. In November 1884 the Queensland Government accepted a tender from Leisner and Sparre to construct the quarantine station for £3645. It was only after the tender was accepted that the site on West Point on the north-west was actually chosen.

In 1896 Cyclone Sigma tore across the island and through Townsville. At least 23 people died, many buildings destroyed and boats wrecked. The ketch Lalla Rookh was torn off its moorings and found later on Magnetic Island. (She was able to be recovered and continued to carry loads of timber up and down the coast, until being wrecked off the Queensland coast in 1899.)

By 1890 a resort had been started in Picnic Bay. In 1898 Robert Hayles Sr was so impressed by the potential of Magnetic Island he sold his other interests to build a resort on the island. Hayles was responsible for much of the development of Magnetic Island through tourism. In 1901 he started a regular ferry service to the island with his ship the Bee. Twelve months later this ship was wrecked on the rocks at Nobby Head, Picnic Bay, and the Phoenix was built by Hayles' sons to replace the vessel. The Hayles company remained operating services to Magnetic Island with a large number of different vessels until 1988.

World War II

Magnetic Island became an important defensive position during World War II because of its proximity to Townsville, an important military base, and its views over Cleveland Bay, a significant anchorage and assembly point for large fleets and convoys operating in the south Pacific. As such, the Magnetic Battery, (AKA The Forts) an artillery battery and observation post, was built in the hinterland of Florence, Horseshoe and Arthur Bays. Picnic Bay also became a popular defence force rest and relaxation camp following the commandeering of a resort in the bay in 1939.

Post-war era
The island slowly expanded following the end of the Second World War. In 1953, Centaur House, a memorial convalescent and rest hostel for nurses, was officially opened in Geoffrey Bay. 

In late December 1971 Cyclone Althea hit the North Queensland coast directly crossing Magnetic Island. The island, along with much of the mainland, was devastated with 90% of the island's houses damaged or destroyed, some simply lifted off their foundations and tossed into trees. The island, along with the mainland, soon recovered.

In July 2012, a six hectare (15 acre) section of the island was granted to the Wulgurukaba Yunbenun Aboriginal Corporation under freehold title and a further 55 hectare (135 acre) section under a Deed of Grant in Trust.

21st century

In 2009, as part of the Q150 celebrations, the Magnetic Island was announced as one of the Q150 Icons of Queensland for its role as a "Natural attraction".

Geography

Geographic features include Rocky Bay, Picnic Bay and Hawkings Point (around the settlement named Picnic Bay) around its southern point, a bay and settlement called Nelly Bay to the east-north-east, Horseshoe Bay on its northern coast, and Cockle Bay Reef off the western coast.

Natural heritage and attractions

The island is a haven for wildlife. 76% of the island is Magnetic Island National Park, which is mostly located on the steep hilly interior and rugged north-western side. A citizen science project at Magnetic (Yunbenun) has over 3500 observations of 1126 species with the most observed species the Koala and the most observed marine species the Goldstripe butterflyfish 

Magnetic Island is famous for its fishing opportunities. Fish around the island include: mackerel, giant trevally, queenfish, coral trout, blackspot tuskfish, tuna, fingermark, red emperor and sea perch.

As of 2013, there are over 800 koalas estimated to be present on the island; this population represents the northern limit of their geographic range.

The areas of the island that are not covered by the conservation area are open for development subject to local authority approval. As of 2018 the island was undergoing an economic boom.

The wreckage of SS City of Adelaide is located off the shore of Cockle Bay, the island and is a popular tourist attraction.

Settlements
The five villages of the island, which contain the lion's share of the population of 2017 (as of the census of population)

Heritage listings
Magnetic Island has a number of heritage-listed sites, including:
 East side of island: Fort Complex
 Esplanade: Picnic Bay Jetty

Education 
There is a primary school at Nelly Bay. The nearest secondary school is Townsville State High School in Railway Estate in the Townsville mainland.

Community groups 
The Magnetic Garbutt branch of the Queensland Country Women's Association meets at the CWA Hall at 42 Lancaster Street, Garbutt.

Annual events
Annual events include:
 Great Tropical Jazz Party (August)
 The Great Island Trek (September)
 Maggie Island Triathlon (October)
 SeaLink Magnetic Island Race Week (August/September)

Notable residents 

 Julian Assange, WikiLeaks co-founder, sporadically lived the first years of his life in Nelly Bay with his mother in the early 1970s.
 Izzy Bee and family from Izzy's Koala World
 Breanna Koenen captain of the Brisbane Lions in the AFLW

See also

 List of islands of Australia

References

External links

 

 
Islands of Queensland
Suburbs of Townsville
Queensland in World War II